This is a calendar of saints list for the Armenian Apostolic Church.

Days of observance - 2018

January
 1 Third Day of the Fast of the Nativity
 2 Fourth Day of the Fast of the Nativity
 3 Fifth Day of the Fast of the Nativity
 4 Sixth Day of the Fast of the Nativity
 5 Eve of the Nativity and Theophany of our Lord Jesus Christ
 6 Feast of the Nativity and Theophany of our Lord Jesus Christ
 7 Second Day of Nativity, Day of the Remembrance of the Dead
 8 Third Day of Nativity
 9 Fourth Day of Nativity
 10 Fifth Day of Nativity
 11 Sixth Day of Nativity
 12 Seventh Day of Nativity
 13 Eighth Day of Nativity, Feast of the Naming of our Lord Jesus Christ
 13 First Sunday after Nativity
 14 Birth of Saint John the Forerunner
 16 Saints Peter the Patriarch, Blaise the Bishop and Absolom the Deacon
 17 Fast Day
 18 The Hermits Saints Anton, Triphon, Barsauma and Onouphrius
 19 Fast Day
 20 Saints Theodosius and the Children of Ephesus
 21 Second Sunday after Nativity
 22 Saints Kryiakos, Julita, Gordius, Polyeuctus and Saint Grigoris
 23 Saints Vahan of Goghtn, Eugenia the Virgin, Phillip, Cladia, Sergius and Apito, and the Two Eunuchs
 24 Fast Day
 25 Saints Eugenius, Marcarius, Alerius, Canditus and Aquila
 26 Fast Day
 27 Holy Fathers Saints Athanasius and Cyril of Alexandria and Gregory of Theologian
 28 Third Sunday after Nativity
 29 First Day of the Fast of the Catechumens
 30 Second Day of the Fast of the Catechumens
 31 Third Day of the Fast of the Catechumens

February
 1 Fourth Day of the Fast of the Catechumens, Remembrance of the Prophet Jonah
 2 Fifth Day of the Fast of the Catechumens. Remembrance of the Prophet Jonah
 3 St. Sarkis the Warrior and his son Martiros and his Fourteen Soldiers
 4 Fourth Sunday after Nativity
 5 Saints Adom and his soldiers
 6 The Holy Soukiasian Martyrs
 7 Fast Day
 8 The Holy Voskian Priests
 9 Fast Day
 10 Catholicos St. Sahak Parthev
 11 Fifth Sunday after Nativity
 12 Saints Mark the Bishop, Plonius the Priest, Cyril and Benjamin the Deacons, and Martyrs Abdelmseh, Ormistan and Sayen
 13 St. Leontius the Priest and his Companions
 14 Presentation of our Lord Jesus Christ to the Temple
 15 St. Vartan Mamikonian and his Companions
 16 Fast Day
 17 150 Fathers of the Holy Council of Constantinople (AD 381)
 18 Great Barekendan
 19 First Day of Great Lent
 20 Second Day of Great Lent
 21 Third Day of Great Lent
 22 Fourth Day of Great Lent
 23 Fifth Day of Great Lent
 24 Sixth Day of Great Lent, St. Theodore the Warrior
 25 Second Sunday of Great Lent, Sunday of the Expulsion
 26 Eighth Day of Great Lent
 27 Ninth Day of Great Lent
 28 Tenth Day of Great Lent

March
 1 Eleventh Day of Great Lent
 2 Twelfth Day of Great Lent
 3 Thirteenth Day of Great Lent, Saints Cyril of Jerusalem, Cyril the Bishop and Anna
 4 Third Sunday of Great Lent, Sunday of the Prodigal Son
 5 Fifteenth Day of Great Lent
 6 Sixteenth Day of Great Lent
 7 Seventeenth Day of Great Lent
 8 Eighteenth Day of Great Lent
 9 Nineteenth Day of Great Lent
 10 Twentieth Day of Great Lent, Sts. John of Jerusalem, John of Otzoon, John of Oritri and Gregory of Datev
 11 Fourth Sunday of Great Lent, Sunday of the Steward
 12 Twenty Second Day of Great Lent
 13 Twenty Third Day of Great Lent
 14 Twenty Fourth Day of Great Lent, Median day of Lent
 15 Twenty Fifth Day of Great Lent
 16 Twenty Sixth Day of Great Lent
 17 Twenty Seventh Day of Great Lent, Forty Holy Martyrs of Sebastia
 18 Fifth Sunday of Great Lent, Sunday of the Judge
 19 Twenty Ninth Day of Great Lent
 20 Thirtieth Day of Great Lent
 21 Thirty First Day of Great Lent
 22 Thirty Second Day of Great Lent
 23 Thirty Third Day of Great Lent
 24 Thirty Fourth Day of Great Lent, St. Gregory the Illuminator - Commitment to the Pit
 25 Sixth Sunday of Great Lent, Sunday of the Advent
 26 Thirty Sixth Day of Great Lent
 27 Thirty Seventh Day of Great Lent
 28 Thirty Eighth Day of Great Lent
 29 Thirty Ninth Day of Great Lent
 30 Fortieth Day of Great Lent: Feast of the Annunciation of the Holy Virgin Mary
 31 Forty First Day of Great Lent: Remembrance of the Raising of Lazarus (Lazarus Saturday), Fast

April
 1 Holy Week, Palm Sunday
 2 Great Monday
 3 Great Tuesday, Remembrance of the Ten Virgins
 4 Great Wednesday
 5 Holy Thursday, Remembrance of the Last Supper
 6 Holy Friday, Commemoration of the Passion, Crucifixion, and Burial of our Lord Jesus Christ
 7 Holy Saturday: Eve of the Resurrection of our Lord Jesus Christ
 8 Easter Sunday, Resurrection of our Lord Jesus Christ
 9 Second Day of Easter, Remembrance of the Dead (Easter)
 10 Third Day of Easter
 11 Fourth Day of Easter
 12 Fifth Day of Easter
 13 Sixth Day of Easter
 14 Seventh Day of Easter
 15 Thomas Sunday (New Sunday)
 16 Ninth Day of Easter Tide
 17 Tenth Day of Easter Tide
 18 Eleventh Day of Easter Tide
 19 Twelfth Day of Easter Tide
 20 Thirteenth Day of Easter Tide
 21 Fourteenth Day of Easter Tide
 22 Third Sunday, Sunday of the World Church (Green Sunday)
 23 Sixteenth Day of Easter Tide
 24 Seventeenth Day of Easter Tide
 25 Eighteenth Day of Easter Tide
 26 Nineteenth Day of Easter Tide
 27 Twentieth Day of Easter Tide
 28 Twenty First Day of Easter Tide
 29 Fourth Sunday, Red Sunday
 30 Twenty Third Day of Easter Tide

May
 1 Twenty Fourth Day of Easter Tide
 2 Twenty Fifth Day of Easter Tide
 3 Twenty Sixth Day of Easter Tide
 4 Twenty Seventh Day of Easter Tide
 5 Twenty Eighth Day of Easter Tide
 6 Fifth Sunday
 7 Thirtieth Day of Easter Tide
 8 Thirty First Day of Easter Tide
 9 Thirty Second Day of Easter Tide
 10 Thirty Third Day of Easter Tide
 11 Thirty Fourth Day of Easter Tide
 12 Thirty Fifth Day of Easter Tide
 13 Sixth Sunday of Eastertide
 14 Thirty Seventh Day of Eastertide
 15 Thirty Eighth Day of Eastertide
 16 Thirty Ninth Day of Eastertide
 17 Fortieth Day of Eastertide, Feast of the Ascension of our Lord Jesus Christ
 18 Forty First Day of Eastertide
 19 Forty Second Day of Eastertide
 20 Second Palm Sunday
 21 St. Helen and St. Constantine the Great - Equal to the Apostles
 22 Forty Fifth Day of Eastertide
 23 Forty Sixth Day of Eastertide
 24 Forty Seventh Day of Eastertide
 25 Forty Eighth Day of Eastertide
 26 Forty Ninth Day of Eastertide
 27 Pentecost
 28 Second Day of Pentecost: Fast
 29 Third Day of Pentecost: Fast
 30 Fourth Day of Pentecost: Fast
 31 Fifth Day of Pentecost: Fast

June
 1 Sixth Day of Pentecost: Fast
 2 Seventh Day of Pentecost: Fast
 3 Remembrance of the Prophet Elijah
 4 St. Hripsime and her companions
 5 St. Gayane and her companions
 6 Fast Day
 7 Commemoration Day of St. John the Forerunner (the Baptist) and Bishop Atanagine
 8 Fast Day
 9 Feast of St. Gregory the Enlightener (Deliverance from the Pit)
 10 Second Sunday after Pentecost: Feast of the Consecration "Shoghakat" of Holy Etchmiadzin
 11 Commemoration Day of the Children of Bethlehem, Acacius the Witness, Movkima the Priest and Kotriatos the Soldier
 12 Holy Virgins Nuneh and Maneh
 13 Fast Day
 14 The Holy Princes, Isaac and Joseph and Martyrs Sarkis and Bacchus
 15 Fast Day
 16 Commemoration Day of St. Nersess the Great and Bishop Khad
 17 Third Sunday after Pentecost: Barekendan of the Feast of St. Gregory the Enlightener
 18 Fast: Saints Epiphanius Bishop of Cyprus, Babylas the Patriarch, and his three disciples
 19 Fast: Sts. Constantine the Emperor and his mother Helen
 20 Fast Day
 21 Fast: Saints Theodotus of Galatia, and Thalelaus the Physician, and the Seven Martyred Virgins of Ancyra
 22 Fast Day
 23 Feast of St. Gregory the Enlightener (Discovery of His Relics)
 24 Fourth Sunday after Pentecost
 25 Commemoration Day of martyrs St. Antoninus, St. Theophilus, St. Anicetus and St. Potinus
 26 Feast Day of the Saints Prophet Daniel, and Companions Shadrach, Meshach and Abednego
 27 Fast Day
 28 Holy Translators Saints Sahak and Mesrop
 29 Fast Day
 30 Saints King Tiridates, Queen Ashkhen and Princess Khosrovidukht

July
 1 Fifth Sunday after Pentecost, Feast of the Discovery of St. Mary's Box
 2 Commemoration Day of St. Kalistratos and his 49 companions, and Lukianos the Priest
 3 Feast Day of Saint Zechariah the Prophet
 4 Fast Day
 5 Feast Day of Saint Elisha the Prophet
 6 Fast Day
 7 Feast Day of the Twelve Holy Apostles of Christ and St Paul, the Thirteenth Apostle
 8 Sixth Sunday after Pentecost, Paregentan of the Fast of Transfiguration
 9 First Day of the Fast of the Transfiguration
 10 Second Day of the Fast of the Transfiguration
 11 Third Day of the Fast of the Transfiguration
 12 Fourth Day of the Fast of the Transfiguration
 13 Fifth Day of the Fast of the Transifiguration
 14 Commemoration of the Old Ark and the Feast of the New Holy Church
 15 Feast of the Transfiguration of our Lord (Vartavar)
 16 Second Day of Transfiguration, Remembrance of the Dead (Transfiguration)
 17 Third Day of Transfiguration
 18 Fast Day
 19 Feast Day of Saint Isaiah the Prophet
 20 Fast Day
 21 Saints Thaddeus Apostle of Armenia and Sandoukht the Virgin
 22 Second Sunday after Transfiguration
 23 Saints Cyprian and the Forty-five Martyrs, and the Virgins Justina, Euphemia, and Christina
 24 Saints Athenogenes the Bishop and the Ten Disciples and Five Martyrs
 25 Fast Day
 26 Commemoration Day of the Holy Forefathers; Adam, Abel, Seth, Enos, Enoch, Noah, Melchizedech, Abraham, Isaac, Jacob, Joseph, Moses, Aaron, Eleazar, Joshua, Samuel, Samson, Jephthah, Barak, Gideon, and other Holy Patriarchs
 27 Fast Day
 28 Sons and Grandsons of Saint Gregory the Enlightener: Saints Aristakes, Vertanes, Hoosik, Grogoris and Daniel
 29 Third Sunday after Transfiguration
 30 Commemoration Day of the Maccabees, Eleazar the Priest, Shamuna and Her Seven Sons
 31 Commemoration Day of the 12 Minor Prophets -Hosea, Joel, Amos, Obadiah, Jonah, Micah, Nahum, Habakkuk, Zephaniah, Haggai, Zechariah and Malachi

August
 1 Fast Day
 2 Saints Sophis, Pistis, Elpis and Agape
 3 Fast Day
 4 200 Fathers of the Holy Council of Ephesus (AD 431)
 5 4th Sunday after Transfiguration
 6 First Day of the Fast of the Holy Mother of God
 7 Second Day of the Fast of the Holy Mother of God
 8 Third Day of the Fast of the Holy Mother of God
 9 Fourth Day of the Fast of the Holy Mother of God
 10 Fifth Day of the Fast of the Holy Mother of God
 11 Feast Day of the Apparition of Holy Etchmiadzin
 12 Feast of the Dormition of the Holy Mother of God (Assumption)
 13 Second Day of the Dormition, Remembrance of the Dead
 14 Third Day of the Dormition
 15 Fourth Day of the Dormition
 16 Fifth Day of the Dormition
 17 Sixth Day of the Dormition
 18 Seventh Day of the Dormition
 19 Second Sunday after the Dormition
 20 Ninth Day of Dormition
 21 Feast Day of Saints Joachim and Anna, parents of the Holy Mother of God and the Oil-bearing women
 22 Fast Day
 23 Saint Jeremiah the Prophet
 24 Fast Day
 25 Saints Thomas, James and Simon
 26 Third Sunday after Dormition, Feast Day of the Discovery of the Belt of the Holy Mother of God
 27 Saints Stephen of Oulnia and the Martyrs Goharinus, Zamidus, Techuicus and Ratigus
 28 The Holy Prophets Ezekial, Ezra and Zachariah
 29 Fast Day
 30 Saints John the Forerunner and Job the Righteous

September
 1 318 Fathers of the Holy Council of Nicaea (AD 325)
 2 Fourth Sunday after Dormition
 3 Saints Andrew the Soldier and his army; Saints Callinicus and Diometes
 4 Saints Adrian and Natalia, and the martyrs Saints Theordorus and Eleutheriu
 5 Fast
 6 Saints Abraham and Khoren, Cosmo and Damian and Theodoron the Martyr
 7 Fast Day
 8 Feast of the Nativity of the Holy Mother of God
 9 Fifth Sunday after the Assumption
 10 First day of the Fast of the Holy Cross
 11 Second day of the Fast of the Holy Cross
 12 Third day of the Fast of the Holy Cross
 13 Fourth day of the Fast of the Holy Cross
 14 Fifth day of the Fast of the Holy Cross
 15 Feast of the Holy Church in view of the Holy Cross
 16 Feast of the Exaltation of the Holy Cross
 17 Feast of the Holy Cross, Day of the Remembrance of the dead
 18 Feast of the Holy Church
 19 Fast: Feast of the Holy Church
 20 Feast of the Holy Church
 21 Feast of the Holy Cross
 22 Feast of the Holy Cross
 23 Second Sunday after the Holy Cross:Paregentan of the Holy Cross of Varak
 24 Fast: Saints Mamas, Philomenos and Simeon the Stylite
 25 Fast: Holy Virgins Febronia, Marina and Shooshan
 26 Fast
 27 Fast: Day of the Holy Father Barlaam, Anthimus and Irenaeus
 28 Fast
 29 Saints George the Warrior, Adauctus and Romanos the Melodist
 30 Third Sunday after the Holy Cross: Feast of the Holy Cross of Varak

October
 1 Saints David of Dvin and the Martyrs Lambeos and Lambeas
 2 Saints Eustathius, Theophistias and their two sons, the Holy Virgins Iermonia and Catherine
 3 Fast
 4 The Saintly Princes Sahak and Hamazasb
 5 Fast
 6 Seventy Two Holy Disciples of Christ
 7 Fourth Sunday after the Holy Cross, Fast
 8 Saints Phocas the Patriarch and Irenaeus of Lyons, follower of the Apostles
 9 Virgin Saints Thecla, Barbara and Pelagia
 10 Fast
 11 Saints Pantaleon the Physician, Hermolaus the Priest and Eupraxia the Virgin
 12 Fast
 13 Holy Translators Mesrob, Yeghishe, Moses the Poet, David the Philosopher, Gregory of Narek and Nerses the Graceful
 14 Fifth Sunday after the Holy Cross
 15 Discovery of the Relic of Saint Gregory, Catholicos of the Alans, and the Holy Fathers Tatoul, Barrus, Thomas, Anthony, Chronides, and the Seven Vegetarian Hermits
 16 The Holy Apostles Ananias, Matthias, Barnabas, Philip, John, Silas and Silvanus
 17 Fast day
 18 Saints Dionysius the Areopagite and the Apostes Timothy and Titus
 19 Fast
 20 Holy Evangelists Matthew, Mark, Luke and John
 21 Sixth Sunday after the Holy Cross
 22 Saints Longinus the Centurion, Joseph the Father-of-God, Joseph of Arimathea and Lazarus, Martha and Mary
 23 Saints Theodoret the Priest of Antioch, Zenon the soldier, Marcarius, Eudoxius and Romulus
 24 Fast
 25 Saints Kharityants, the Martyrs Artemius and Christopher, and Niceta and Aquilina
 26 Fast
 27 The Twelve Holy Doctors; Hierotheus of Athens, Dionysius the Areopagite, Silverst of Rome, Athanasius of Alexandria, Cyril of Jerusalem, Ephraem the Syrian, Vails of Caesarea, Gregory of Nyssa, Gregory the Theologian, Epiphanius of Cyprus, John Chrysostom, and Cyril of Alexandria
 28 Seventh Sunday after the Holy Cross. Discovery of the Holy Cross
 29 Saints Anastasius the Priest, Varus, Theodota and her sons, and those who were martyred with her
 30 Saints Huperichians of Samosata
 31 Fast

November
 1 St. John Chrysostom
 2 Fast
 3 Feast of All Saints
 4 Eighth Sunday after the Holy Cross
 5 Saints Stephen, Patriarch of Rome and the priests deacons and faithful
 6 Saints Aquiphsimeus the Bishop, Joseph the Priest, Ayethalus the Deacon, and Plato the Martyr
 7 Fast
 8 Saints Metrophanes and Alexander, Patriarchs of Constantinople, and Paul the Confessor, and the Scribes Marcian and Martyrius
 9 Fast
 10 Holy Archangels Gabriel and Michael and all the heavenly hosts
 11 Ninth Sunday after the Holy Cross
 12 Saints Meletius Bishop of Antioch, Menas the Egyptian, and the other Meletius, Bishop of Persia, Buras the Priest and Sennen the Deacon
 13 Saints Demetrius the Martyr and Basil the Priest
 14 Fast
 15 Saints Gurias, Samonas, Abibas the Deacon, Romanus the Monk, Barula the Confessing Youth and Hesychius the Soldier
 16 Fast
 17 The Holy Apostles Andrew and Phillip
 18 Tenth Sunday after the Holy Cross
 19 First Day of the Fast of Advent
 20 Second Day of the Fast of Advent: Presentation of the Holy Mother of God to the Temple
 21 Third Day of the Fast of Advent
 22 Fourth Day of the Fast of Advent
 23 Fifth Day of the Fast of Advent
 24 Saints Gregory the Wonderworker, Nicholas the Bishop and Myron the Bishop
 25 First Sunday of Advent
 26 The Holy Virgins Juliana and Basilla
 27 Saints Lucian the Priest, Tarachus, robus, Andronicus, Onesimus, and other Disciples of Saint Paul
 28 Fast
 29 Saints Clement the Bishop and Bagarat the Bishop of Taormina
 30 Fast

December
 1 Holy Apostles Thaddeus and Bartholomew, First Illuminators of Armenia
 2 Second Sunday of Advent
 3 Saints Gennaro the Bishop and Mercurius the Warrios, Jacoc and Themistocles
 4 Saint Abgar the Witness
 5 Fast
 6 The Holy Fathers of Egypt Paul, Paul the Simple, Marcarius of Alexandria, Evagrius, John, John the little, Nilus, Arsenius, Siseos, Daniel, Serapion, Marcarius the Elder, Poeman, and other Holy Fathers
 7 Fast
 8 Patriarch Saint Nicholas of Smyrna the Wonderworker
 9 Third Sunday of Advent: Feast of the Conception of the Holy Virgin Mary
 10 Fast: Saints Mennas, Hermongenes, Eugraphius and John and Alexis
 11 Fast: Saints Cornelius the Centurion, Simeon the Relative of Christ, Polycarp the Bishop of Smyrna and the Martyrs that perished in the East
 12 Fast
 13 Fast: Saints Eustratius, Auxentius, Eugenius, Orestes and Martyrius
 14 Fast
 15 Saints James of Nisibis, Marouke the Mermit and Melitus the Bishop
 16 Fourth Sunday of Advent
 17 The Holy Fathers Ignatius Bishop of Antioch, and Addais, Maruthas the Bishop
 18 Saints Theopompas the Bishop, Theonas the Martyr and the Four Soldiers, Basus, Eusebe, Eutyche and Basilides
 19 Fast Day
 20 The Holy Virgins Indus and Domna, Clericus the Elder and the 20,000 Martyrs of the church of Nicomedia
 21 Fast
 22 Saints Basil the Patriarch, Gregory of Nyssa, Silvester the Patriarch of Rome, and Ephraim of Syria
 23 Fifth Sunday of Advent
 24 Saints David the Prophet-King and the Holy Apostle James
 25 St. Stephen the Protodeacon and First Martyr
 26 Fast
 27 Holy Apostles Peter and Paul
 28 Fast
 29 Holy Apostles, James and John, "Sons of Thunder": Paregentan of the Fast of Nativity
 30 Sixth Sunday of Advent
 31 First Day of the Fast of Nativity

See also 
 Armenian calendar

References 
 Saints' Days from Armenian Apostolic Church

Saints of the Armenian Apostolic Church
Liturgical calendars